The Mercedes-Benz G-Class, sometimes colloquially called the G-Wagen (as an abbreviation of Geländewagen) is a four-wheel drive automobile manufactured by Magna Steyr (formerly Steyr-Daimler-Puch) in Austria and sold by Mercedes-Benz. Originally developed as a military off-roader, later more luxurious models were added to the line. In certain markets, it was sold under the Puch name as Puch G until 2000.

The G-Wagen is characterised by its boxy styling and body-on-frame construction. It uses three fully locking differentials, one of the few passenger car vehicles to have such a feature.

Despite the introduction of an intended replacement, the unibody SUV Mercedes-Benz GL-Class in 2006, the G-Class is still in production and is one of the longest-produced vehicles in Daimler's history, with a span of  years. Only the Unimog surpasses it. In 2018, Mercedes-Benz launched a technically new second generation, still with only minor design changes.

The 400,000th unit was built on 4 December 2020.

History 

The G-class was developed as a military vehicle from a suggestion by the Shah of Iran (at the time a significant Mercedes shareholder) to Mercedes and was later offered as a civilian vehicle in 1979. In this military role the vehicle was sometimes referred to as the "Wolf". The Peugeot P4 was a variant made under licence in France with a Peugeot engine. The first military in the world to use it was the Argentine Army (Ejército Argentino) beginning in 1981 with the military model 461, at least one of these was captured in the Falklands and subsequently served with the Royal Air Force.

The development of the G-Class started in 1972 with a cooperative agreement between Daimler-Benz and Steyr-Daimler-Puch in Graz, Austria. Mercedes-Benz engineers in Stuttgart were in charge of design and testing, while the team in Graz developed the production plans. The first wooden model was presented to Daimler-Benz management in 1973, with the first drivable prototype beginning various testing including German coalfields, the Sahara Desert, and the Arctic Circle in 1974. Construction commenced on a new production facility in Graz, where the new cross-country vehicle would be assembled nearly entirely by hand in 1975, with production of the "G Model" beginning in Graz in 1979. In 1980, the Vatican took delivery of a specially made G-Wagen outfitted with a clear thermoplastic top which served as the Popemobile. The “Papa G” later took up permanent residence at the Mercedes-Benz Museum in Stuttgart, Germany.

The first major refinements were introduced in 1981, including an automatic transmission, air conditioning, an auxiliary fuel tank, protective headlamp grilles and a cable winch. Fuel injection became available in 1982, when the 230 GE was introduced in Turin, along with more comfortable and supportive front seats, auxiliary heating, wider tires and fender flares. For 1985, differential locks, central door locking and a tachometer became standard and by 1986 over 50,000 G Models had been produced.

The G-Wagen was facelifted in 1990. In 1989, for the 10th anniversary of the G Model, a new model variant with permanent 4-wheel drive, a wood-trimmed interior and optional Anti-lock Braking System (ABS) debuted at the Frankfurt International Motor Show. Production began the following April. For 1992, production began on a new sub-series for professional users. The civilian model began to offer cruise control, a stainless-steel spare-tire cover, running boards and Burl Walnut wood interior trim. In the same year, the 100,000th G Model was built in Graz and in 1994, the model line was officially renamed the G-Class. Ventilated front disc brakes and a driver's air bag became standard. In 1996 the automatic transmission became an electronically controlled 5-speed unit and headlamp washers, cruise control, and a front passenger's air bag were added. In 1998, the range-topping G 500 with a 296 hp V8 was introduced for series production.

For 1999 a limited run of V8 powered "G 500 Classic" special editions marked the model's 20th anniversary. A multifunction steering wheel was added to all models. Later in the year, the new G 55 AMG debuted as the most powerful G-Class yet, with 354 hp. The U.S. market launch of the G-Class took place in 2001. New alloy wheels, a chrome grille and body-colour bumpers plus a more luxurious cabin were introduced. New dynamic control systems included the Electronic Stability Program (ESP), Brake Assist, and the 4 wheel Electronic Traction System (4 ETS). The G 55 AMG was upgraded in 2004 with a supercharged V8 engine developing 476 hp.

In 2006, a documentary filmmaker was the first foreigner to reach Siberia, the world's coldest region, with a passenger vehicle in winter, driving a stock G 500 nearly 19,000 km without a single breakdown, in temperatures as frigid as −63˚F/-53 °C.

W460 (1979–1992)

The W460 was introduced at a press event held at the off-road proving ground in Toulon, France, and went on sale in September 1979 with three engine choices and five body variants. Over the next decade, the engine and transmission choices were expanded or updated along with more and more optional extra cost creature comforts (air conditioning, automatic transmission, power windows, etc.).

The G-Wagen gained its global fame in 1980 when Mercedes-Benz built a Popemobile based on 230 G cabriolet during the first visit of Pope John Paul II in Germany.

Mercedes-Benz never officially exported the G-Wagen to the United States because it was considered more of a utilitarian vehicle and didn't fit the American perception of what Mercedes-Benz was. During the 1980s, the grey import specialists brought the W460 to the United States and modified them to meet the US regulations. In 1988, the new federal law, Motor Vehicle Safety Compliance Act, closed the loopholes and tightened up the regulations for grey imports, making it more difficult and more expensive for the registered importers to federalise the W460 in a very small number. The other issue was severely underpowered engines in the 230 GE, 280 GE, and 300 GD models might not have appealed to the American market as was the case with the Mercedes-Benz 380 SEL in the early 1980s.

The 200 GE was built specifically for Italian markets and other markets where a heavy tax penalty was incurred for engines larger than 2 litres. The 300 GD was the most popular model while the 280 GE was the most powerful. Despite the availability of turbocharged diesel engines in other Mercedes-Benz vehicles, one was never fitted to the W460.

The rarest W460 variants were the 230 GE 2.6 Brabus (1989–?), the 280 GE AMG, and the 560 GE (1993). AMG modified the 2.8-litre six-cylinder inline petrol engine for more power, . Only two units of the 560 GE were built in 1993 as part of a feasibility study that resulted in a limited series of the W463 500 GE for 1993–1994 and the W463 G 500 from 1998 on.

Derivations

G-Wagen W462 ELBO (1988–?)
This version was assembled from Complete Knock Down (CKD) by ELBO, formerly a Steyr-Daimler-Puch branch division, in Thessaloniki, Greece for the Greek Army. Additionally, the CKD was also assembled at Mercedes-Benz's Aksaray plant in Turkey. The engine options were a 2.3-litre four-cylinder inline petrol and later a 2.9-litre five-cylinder inline diesel.

Peugeot P4 VLTT (1981–1988)

The W460 was assembled in France under licence by Peugeot for the French Army with Peugeot engine and transmission from the 504 and 604 respectively as well as its own seats and wiring system. The front differential gear lock was omitted because Peugeot used its own axles. They are easily identified by rectangular headlamps.

Puch G (1979–2000)
An agreement between Daimler-Benz AG and Steyr-Daimler-Puch stipulated that G-Wagens sold in Austria, Switzerland, Yugoslavia (and its successor states: Bosnia-Herzegovina, Croatia, Macedonia, Serbia, and Slovenia), Mongolia, and Eastern European COMECON countries were called Puch G and elsewhere as Mercedes-Benz G-Wagen/G-Class. The reason for the different branding was due to Puch's reputation for its all-terrain vehicles, the Haflinger and Pinzgauer. Since the agreement expired in 2000, consumers could order a retrofit kit from Magna's Puch Competence Centre to replace the Mercedes-Benz brands with Puch emblems.

For Pope John Paul II's visit to Austria in 1983, Puch emblems was used on the Papamobile instead.

Engines

W461 (1992–2022)

After the new W463 was introduced in 1989 with an extensively updated chassis and a revised front end, the production of the W460 ended in 1991 and was replaced by the W461. The W461 has essentially the same chassis as the W460 but with the powertrain of the W463 and the body of the W460. While the W463 is aimed at consumers who seek more creature comforts and better driving dynamics, the W461 is built specifically for military, public authorities, and non-governmental organisations. That included the 24-Volt electrical system for the W461.

During the 1990s, the W461 was offered with a 2.3-litre four inline petrol engine and a 2.9-litre five inline diesel engine from 1992 to 2001. From 2001 to 2014, the W461 model for military and public authorities was offered with a 2.7-litre inline five turbodiesel engine and later with a 3.0-litre V6 turbodiesel engine. They were called G 270 CDI Worker (2001–2006) and G 280 CDI Worker (2007–2009) respectively.

On 1 October 2021, Mercedes-Benz announced a new variation of W461 called W464.

Civilian Editions

Over the years, Mercedes-Benz had introduced the civilian version of the W461, built in limited numbers and for a limited period of time. They targeted primarily the consumers who wanted the "stripped down" version and did not need the creature comforts. The engine choice was often limited to one type, namely a diesel engine, per series. Those editions were named PUR or Professional.

EDITION.30 PUR
In 2009, Mercedes-Benz, celebrating the 30-year anniversary of the G-Class, introduced the G 280 CDI EDITION.30 PUR as a five-door long wheelbase station wagon. The consumers could order theirs with "Off-Road Package 1" or "Off-Road Package 2". The passenger compartment had four seats upholstered in hard-wearing fabric or vinyl, rubber floor coverings, spray-protected/water-resistant controls, drainage apertures in the footwells, and a wood floor in the load compartment with load lashing lugs and rails. The dashboard received a new instrument cluster from the W463 and dual air bags and the climate control remained manually operated as did the window winders and locks. The exterior received flexible wheel arch flaring, protective grilles for headlamps, taillamps, front turn signal indicators, a walk-on hood/bonnet for easy access to the optional roof rack, a towing lug attached to the front bumper and two-section barn doors at the rear.

PROFESSIONAL
The success of the limited series "EDITION.30 PUR" led to the G 280 CDI Professional in 2009 and its successor, the G 300 CDI Professional, in 2010. Initially the 280 CDI Professional was limited to a five-door long wheelbase station wagon design before the body variants were expanded to five different body variations: a three-door long wheelbase panel van (Kastenwagen in German), a five-door long wheelbase station wagon, a two-door cabriolet and a two or four-door cab chassis truck (Pritschenwagen in German) for the G 300 CDI Professional. The production of the civilian variant continued through 2019. However, the military variant continued through 2022 when it was replaced by the new W464 model.

Engines

G-Class W463, first generation (1990–2018)

For 1990, the W460 was extensively revised, and a new chassis number, W463, was assigned. The W463 moved the G-Class from spartan and utilitarian to a luxury model on par with the Mercedes-Benz S-Class and the luxurious Range Rover. Thus, no three-door panel vans in short and long wheelbase lengths or barn doors in the rear were offered for the W463: those features are exclusive to the W461. The W461 continued in production as military and utilitarian vehicles for the government agencies and non-government organisations.

The exterior was revised to smoothen out the front end and the front fenders/wings were vertically flattened out at the front underneath headlamps. The fender flares and front end (cooling grille and headlamp bezels) were painted in body colour. The headlamps have square and slightly recessed bezels whilst the  grille is narrower to give space for the front numberplate attached to the top of the bumper. The front bumpers are form-fitted and have integrated fog lamps while the rear bumpers have the integrated red rear fog lamp and white reversing lamp. The fuel filler is now covered by a panel. The side running boards were given a standard fitment. The external rear view mirrors have a new housing that pivots on anchors attached to the front doors. New revised tail lamps without white reversing lamps were fitted in the rear.

The interior was significantly updated with wood trim and leather upholstery for the first time. The centre console is smoother and better integrated with the dashboard and the lower part of the dashboard is covered with rubber pads for better knee protection in the event of a frontal collision. The electric differential lock switches are placed prominently in the middle of the dashboard with other electric switches and the instrument cluster has a smoother and more curved housing that meets the dashboard fluidly. The gauges are integrated into one panel rather than a few separate gauges attached to the instrument cluster. The climate control panel was revised to include the temperature and fan speed dials and the door panels are fully trimmed with ruffled leather paneling and soft paddings. The seats are more plush and have several defined cushions along with lumbar support.

The new features included ABS and full-time four-wheel-drive with electrically locking differentials. The engines were carried over from the W460/W461, including the 200 GE, 230 GE, and 300 GE models for petrol engines along with the 250 GD and 300 GD for diesel engines. In 1994, the Geländewagen was renamed as the G-Class when model names were revised to reflect the new corporate nomenclature.

When Mercedes-Benz didn't consider selling the G-Class in the United States, a small registered importer based in New Mexico, Europa International, Inc., began the expensive process of certifying and modifying the G-Class for the US market and started selling them in 1993. When the new G 500 was introduced in 1998, Europa International sought and received the "small-volume manufacturer status", allowing the company to be the exclusive importer and distributor of the G 500 in the United States. The sales success of the G 500 was attributed to Europa International's clever marketing toward high-end luxury clientele and led Mercedes-Benz to the decision of purchasing the distribution rights and including the G-Class in its official US model ranges.

The first generation W463 had the widest range of engines ever fitted to a Mercedes-Benz vehicle during its entire 28-year model run: from four to twelve cylinders; and from natural aspiration to supercharger, turbo, and twin turbo. Towards the end of the first-generation model run the W463 had the highest number of paint colour options at 22, including the bright and intense colours of the Crazy Color Edition.

Models
The W463 had the highest number of body variations and derivations of any post-war Mercedes-Benz:
 two-door cabriolet
 three-door station wagon with short wheelbase
 four-door pickup truck with six wheels (Mercedes-AMG G 63 6x6)
 four-door cabriolet with extended wheelbase (Mercedes-Maybach G 650 Landaulet)
 five-door station wagon with long wheelbase
 five-door station wagon with extended wheelbase (custom built by AMG)
 five-door station wagon with long wheelbase and widened track (Mercedes-Benz G 500 4x4²)

Special models and special editions

500 GE V8 (1993)
Mercedes-Benz premiered a special edition of G-Class with its first-ever V8 engine at 1993 Geneva International Motor Show. The 500 GE V8 was available in 5-door, long wheelbase station wagon and for one year, 1993, only.

The completed body and chassis were shipped from Graz, Austria to AMG engineering centre in Affalterbach where the chassis was modified to accept the M117 V8 engine and beefed up for extra weight and performance.

A special paint finish, Amethyst Blue Metallic, is exclusive to 500 GE V8 and is not available to any other Mercedes-Benz models. The paint finish is extended to the cooling grille, bumpers, mirror housings, and fender flares. The interior is trimmed with black leather containing the contrasting element in medium grey colour, including the steering wheel. The walnut veneer was fitted to the centre console, part of the handbrake lever, the two transmission selector levers, and trim elements on the door cards.

To reflect the exclusivity and higher price, the 500 GE V8 is luxuriously appointed with many accessories as standard equipment: air conditioning, automatic gearbox, cruise control, sliding sunroof, heated seats, power central locking system, electric window winders, and like.

The retail price for the 500 GE V8 was DM 178,250 ($107,381 US at 1993 currency exchange rate and $223,138 US (2022, adjusted)). To put the price in perspectives, a 1993 300 GE (the top-of-line G-Class in a regular production) was DM 88,500, and a 1993 W140 500 SE with M119 V8 engine was DM 129,030.

The production was initially to be limited to 500 units, signifying the "500" in model name: 446 units were actually produced and sold. Mercedes-Benz had a remaining batch of 446 M117 V8 engines when the next-generation M119 production started for W140 S-Class. The wider M119 engine could not fit the engine compartment in G-Class. The V8 engine option for G-Class was reintroduced in 1998 when the G 500 with M113 V8 engine entered into a regular production.

A Puch 500 GE V8 was offered as well: only three units were produced.

AMG offered the performance upgrade kit for 500 GE V8 with 6-litre displacement: 500 GE V8 6.0 AMG. The upgrade kit offers the higher output, higher top speed and quicker acceleration (10.4 seconds to 100 km/h from zero). 13 units of 500 GE V8 received the upgrade kit.

G 500 Classic Special-Edition (1999) 

In 1999, the factory presented the luxuriously equipped G 500 Classic Special-Edition model is unveiled to mark the 20th anniversary of the Mercedes-Benz G-Class. All Classic Special-Edition models were equipped with the 500 V8 engine, all of them received a special Almandinschwarz-Metallic (182) paintwork, which in certain lighting conditions looks black or dark aubergine purple. This limited series design inherited everything from the original classic G-Class, but benefited from the technical developments of the new generation released in 2000. Thus, it remained true to the expression of the Classic, yet technically modern. Among other things, all Classic Special-Edition G-Class receive unique 18" alloy wheels painted in body color inside, with exterior elements painted in vehicle color, Classic inscription strip on the side of the vehicle, stainless steel and painted spare wheel cover, new instrument cluster, equipped with Becker navigation and Hi-Fy with a multi-functional steering wheel appearing for the first time, ultrasonic reversing assist, front and rear seat heating, anti-theft alarm system, illuminated thresholds. The interior is made of black and aubergine purple nappa leather that harmonizes incredibly well with the exterior color, with black suede carpets embroidered with classic lettering and fine burr walnut interior elements. A total of 500 Classic Special-Editions of all versions were produced. 6 RHD and 494 LHD are the most long wheelbase, less short wheelbase and only 12 Cabrios. The G 500 Classic Special-Edition Cabrio is the rarest G-Class Cabrio model ever produced until the end of production of the G-Class Cabrio in 2014.

Grand Edition (2006)
The 500 units of the G 500 and G 55 AMG Grand Edition were built and shipped to the United States when Mercedes-Benz decided to end the sales of G-Class in the United States for 2006 before rescinding its decision. The exterior had an exclusive Allanite Grey Magno metallic paint finish and brushed aluminium trim stripes with "Grand Edition" lettering. The interior had matte-silk wood trim on the dashboard and centre console, designo exclusive leather upholstery, and door sills with illuminated "Grand Edition" lettering.

G 500 Guard (2009–2018)
An armoured version of the long wheelbase G 500 five-door station wagon with bullet resistance level FB6 or FB7.

G-Class LIMITED.30 (2009)
The LIMITED.30 model is a special edition, celebrating the 30-year anniversary of the G-model (1979–2009). This edition includes designo platinum black paint finish, specially designed light-alloy wheels and EDITION30 lettering on the wings. The interior has designo leather in the colour "chablis" and designo trim in anthracite poplar wood.

G 55 AMG KOMPRESSOR "Edition 79" (2009)
Like the LIMITED.30 special edition, the "Edition 79" is exclusive to the Middle East market, celebrating the sales launch in 1979. This edition includes designo magno alanite grey paint finish, a crash bar at the front, carbon fibre side trim stripes, 19-inch AMG wheels with titanium finish, chrome protection grilles for the front turn signal indicators, designo leather upholstery in black/sand colour, a carbon fibre dashboard and centre console trims and an edition logo, e.g. "1 out of 79", placed in front of the gear selector. The vehicle was unveiled in 2009 at the Dubai International Motor Show.

BA3 Final Edition and Edition Selection (2011)
The BA3 Final Edition was launched in 2011 to mark the final production run of the three-door, short wheelbase station wagon. The single model variation was G 350 CDI BlueTEC. This farewell special is distinguished by body-coloured AMG flared wheel arches with 5-twin-spoke light-alloy wheels, carbon optics stripes, an AMG radiator grille, 18-inch alloys, extra chrome trims inside and outside, black leather interior offset by walnut burr veneers and ambient lighting.

At the same time, Mercedes-Benz offered the "Edition Select" special for the five-door model, G 500. Edition Selection applies the same special edition treatment to the G 500/G 550 even though the five-door long wheelbase station wagon would continue for several more years.

G 55 AMG long "mastermind" Limited (2012)
As a brand awareness collaboration for the Fashion Week, Mercedes-Benz Japan and mastermind JAPAN built five units for the Japanese market. Externally, the chrome trims and wheels were done in black paint finish, and two stickers were affixed to the side panels at the rear. The mastermind JAPAN skull and bone badges were affixed to the headrests and spare wheel cover. The interior was done in black leather trim with the roof liner finished in light grey Alcantara.

G 550 Night Edition (2013–2015)
Exclusive to the Japanese market, 100 units of the G 550 Night Edition were produced with a black paint finish, AMG badges on the front fenders/wings and five twin-spoke, aluminium wheels finished in titanium grey. Two choices of interior colours were offered: porcelain white (60 units) and classic red (40 units). The dashboard and centre console were trimmed with designo piano lacquer black wood. The roof liner was Alcantara in anthracite colour. The sales price was ¥13,900,000 JPY.

G-Class Cabriolet "Final Edition 200" (2013–2014)
To commemorate the production end of the two-door cabriolet, Mercedes-Benz introduced the "Final Edition 200" with the G 500 being the only model variation. All of the 200 units had been sold out prior to its premiere at 2013 Frankfurt Auto Show. Externally, the soft top and tonneau cover are beige in colour, the grille is chrome-coloured, and the 5-spoke light-alloy wheels are painted in titanium grey. The B-pillars are fitted with "Final Edition 200" badges. The interior received designo leather seats and door panels coloured in ecru with black trim, satin-finished light brown poplar wood trim, and an AMG performance steering wheel.

G 500 4×4²

Continuing with the G 63 AMG 6×6 formula, Mercedes-Benz introduced the G 500 4×4², using the body of the long wheelbase 5-door station wagon on a shortened chassis from the G 63 AMG 6×6. The G500 4×4², along with the G 500/G 550, received a new 4.0-litre biturbo V8 (M176), producing . The exterior is the same as the Mercedes-AMG G 63 and G 65 despite the G 500 4×4² not being a Mercedes-AMG edition.

Mercedes-Maybach G 650 Landaulet (2017)
Following the success of the G 63 AMG 6×6 and G 500 4×4², Mercedes-Benz introduced the first SUV under the sub-brand name Mercedes-Maybach at the Geneva Motor Show in March 2017. G 650 Landaulet used the extended chassis with the portal axles and raised suspension system from the G 500 4×4². The rear end of the G 650 Landaulet was built from the rear part of the W463 cabriolet with a folding fabric roof covering the rear half of the body behind the B-pillar. The rear passenger doors with no wheel-opening cut-out were from the G 55 with extended wheelbase (2001). The front end is from the Mercedes-AMG G 65 with more chrome trims. The light alloy wheels and extendable side running boards are chrome plated. The powertrain is from the G 65 with the  biturbo V12.

The interior is finished in ultimate luxury as found in Mercedes-Maybach GLS-Class and S-Class. Like the original Maybach 62 Landaulet, a division wall is installed behind the driver and front passenger. The second row seats are moved further back from the rear passenger doors and are the same rear seats as used in the Mercedes-Maybach S-Class. A second control panel and centre console is installed behind the division wall toward the rear. The dashboard above the second set is one set of the two front passenger's dashboards with a glove box and hold two large LED monitors.

The sales price was €749,700, and the production was limited to 99 units.

AMG models

500 GE 6.0 AMG (1993-1995)
For the first time, an AMG version of the G-Class was offered in 1993 with the 500 GE 6.0 AMG. The increased output did not make the 500 GE 6.0 AMG much faster with a time of 10.9 seconds for 0–. Only thirteen units were built in long wheel base form and only one unit with a short wheel base.

G 36 AMG (1994–1997)
After AMG entered into co-operation with Mercedes-Benz in 1993, the G 36 AMG was introduced and fitted with the M104.992, the same engine as found in the C 36 AMG and E 36 AMG.

G 43 AMG (1997–1998)
A total of 38 units  of the G43 AMG were produced between 1997 and 1998, all of the as special orders under country code "293 Company Vehicle", mostly for VIPs and probably secret services. 6 of them bore 463.233 chassis numbers, as though they were G320 LWBs that had their V6 engine replaced with a type M113.982 V8 engine. Bizarrely, the remaining 32 units were coded 463.241, meaning that they were meaning to be G500 LWB that had the M113.982 AMG 4.3-litre engine fitted in lieu of the  M113.962 standard 5-litre engine.

G 63 AMG V12 (2002)
The G 63 AMG V12 was a very limited production run with only five units built in 2002. It was the first G-Class with a V12 engine before Mercedes-AMG officially introduced the more powerful G 65 AMG.

G 55 AMG (2002–2003) and G 55 AMG Kompressor (2004–2012)

Citing the sales success of the G 500 in the United States and the absorption of AMG into DaimlerChrysler AG, Mercedes-Benz began to expand the AMG versions to several models, including the G-Class. To coincide with the official launch of the G-Class in the United States, Mercedes-Benz introduced the 55 AMG along with the G 500 in 2001 for the 2002 model year. The G 55 AMG visually did not differ from the G 500 other than side exhaust pipes, wider tyres, AMG five-spoke wheels, chrome tip at bottom of front bumper, and AMG lettering in the rear. The G 55 AMG became the favourite of celebrities and the wealthy.

To differentiate the G 55 AMG KOMPRESSOR from the G 500 visually, AMG changed the radiator grille to three thick fins, added the embossed metal KOMPRESSOR lettering underneath the V8 badge on the front fenders/wings, and introduced new light-alloy wheels in titanium grey and three new metallic paint colours (Calcite White, Periclase Green, and Teallite Blue). The 0– acceleration was reduced from 7.4 to 5.6 seconds.

G 63 AMG (2012–2018)

The supercharged 5.4-litre V8 was replaced by the new 5.5-litre biturbo V8 for 2012 (2013MY in USA) for better fuel consumption and lower emissions. AMG made some more changes to the exterior to give the G 63 AMG a more "brawly" appearance: single horizontal fin with twin chrome edges in the middle of the radiator grille with a more prominent three-pointed star ornament in the middle, a new light-alloy wheel design, three enlarged airflow inlets on both sides and in the middle of the front bumper, vertical chrome stripes to cover the small bumper guards and exterior rear-view mirrors from the GL-Class and ML-Class. The mechanical upgrade was an AMG sports exhaust system with high-gloss chrome inserts, larger AMG high performance brakes with six-piston fixed calipers at the front from the ML 63 AMG and revised suspension and damper settings for more dynamic handling characteristics. The new E-SELECT gear selector from  the Mercedes-Benz SLS replaced the standard gear selector.

For 2016, the name was changed to Mercedes-AMG G 63.

G 65 AMG (2012–2018)

The G 63 AMG V12, built in 2012, demonstrated the feasibility of installing a V12 engine in the G-Class. The new G 65 AMG was introduced at the same time as the G 63 AMG, making the G 65 AMG the third passenger SUV to have a V12 engine with Lamborghini LM002 (built from 1986 to 1993) being the first one. G 65 AMG was equipped as the G 63 AMG other than minor cosmetic differences with V12 BITURBO badges on the  front fenders/wings, floor mats and seat backs.

Like the G 63, the name was changed to Mercedes-AMG G 65 for 2016.

G 63 AMG 6×6 (2013–2015)

To mark the thirtieth anniversary of G-Wagen production, Mercedes-Benz introduced the new stretched version with six-wheel-drive system and portal axles. The G 63 AMG 6×6 was derived from a model developed specifically for the Australian Army in 2007.

The consumer reception of the G 63 AMG 6×6 was stronger than anticipated, and Mercedes-Benz sold slightly more than 100 units, with the last customer delivery taking place in May 2015.

Concept cars

Mercedes-Benz G-Wagen Light Armoured Patrol Vehicle 6.X CONCEPT (2010)
It is an armoured patrol vehicle developed with EADS, based on LAPV 5.4. EADS provided the communication technology: vehicle data recorder system, integrated communication system for UHF or VHF bands, integrated mobile command, control and information system, and jamming system. The vehicle was unveiled in EUROSATORY 2010.

Ener-G-Force (2012)

The Ener-G-Force was a concept vehicle in response to the Los Angeles Design Challenge 2012 for a future police car. The vehicle was unveiled at the 2012 LA Auto Show. The concept vehicle was hydrogen-powered with fuel cells generating the electricity to the electric motors inside the wheel hubs. A roof rack contained the water tanks with a hydrogen converter, and the body included a three-panel greenhouse, 20-inch wheels and side skirts illuminating the charge and operation status of energy packs.

Marketing
The W463 was positioned in the marketplace as a luxury passenger vehicle to compete with the likes of Range Rover. After Mercedes-Benz launched the G-Class in the United States with the G 500 and G 55 AMG models, the G-Class became very popular with celebrities, film stars, and the wealthy. The G-Class has appeared in numerous films, television series, and music videos ever since.

As part of Mercedes-Benz's attempt to demonstrate the off-road capability of the G-Class SUV, seven G-Class vehicles took a journey from Halls Creek in Western Australia to Wiluna. However, shock absorbers on six of the vehicles (5 civilian G 350s and 1 military model) were broken during their trip on the corrugations of the Canning Stock Route on day 7. Mercedes-Benz Australia later arranged for the replacement shock absorbers to land in Perth, before transferring to a light plane destined for a remote Aboriginal settlement close to Well 33, about 1000 km from Wiluna. The parts would be delivered by the sole surviving vehicle, a G-Professional.

End of production debacle and revised decisions
Mercedes-Benz announced that 2005 would be the final year of the G-Class to be sold in the United States, citing the new GL-Class as its successor. The 500 units of G 500 and G 55 AMG Grand Edition were built and shipped to the United States. However, an unexpected order placed by the U.S. Marine Corps for 157 Interim Fast Attack Vehicle (IFAV) based on the G-Class, replacing its ageing, slow, and cumbersome Desert Patrol Vehicles, caused Mercedes-Benz to rescind its decision and to continue offering the G-Class in the United States.

This Grand Edition also led to the rumours of the end of production of the W463 in 2006. A few factors contributed to the rumours: the increasing difficulties in meeting the newer and stricter safety and emission regulations, especially the new EU regulations on pedestrian protection; Mercedes-Benz had introduced new GL-Class as an intended successor; and military contracts fulfilled. An outcry among enthusiasts who admired the G-Class for its tremendous off-road potential along with its reputation and cachet showed that a market still existed for such a vehicle. On 11 November 2005, Dieter Zetsche, DaimlerChrysler Board of Management member and head of the Mercedes Car Group, announced that G-Class production would continue. At the Paris Motor Show in September 2006, Mercedes-Benz reiterated that the G-Class would continue to be manufactured through 2015 due to the strong worldwide demand by both civilian and military buyers. Daimler AG extended the manufacturing contract with Magna Steyr to continue producing the W463 until 2017.

In late 2017, the end of production of the first generation W463 was announced with the heavily reengineered and updated successor to be introduced in 2018 for the 2019 model year.

Updates (1990–2018)

1994 update
The update was minor with the model designation revised to reflect the new nomenclature system and with an enlarged six-cylinder inline petrol engine for the G 320, replacing the G 300. The Italy-only 200 GE/G 200 and 230 GE/G 230 were dropped, marking the end for the G-Class with the four-cylinder inline engine until G 350 was reintroduced for Chinese market in 2020. After the 200 GE/G 200, 230 GE/G 230, and 300 GE/G 300 were dropped in 1994, manual transmission was dropped from the W463 for good. The steering wheel received the driver's side airbag.

1997 update
The W463 received its mechanical update in 1997. The update included a new power-assisted folding mechanism for its convertible. The engine range was revised with six-cylinder engines shifting from inline to V-form for both petrol and diesel versions. The G 500 was reintroduced with a new V8 petrol engine. The W463 received dual airbags for the driver and the front passenger.

2002 update
The external rear-view mirrors were revised with integrated turn signal repeaters and power-assisted mirror control, eliminating the separate turn signal indicators attached to the body. The front and rear turn signal indicators received a clear lens. The newly-revised headlamps for both American and international markets were also given clear glass lenses. The interior was updated with more creature comforts and better control switches. In 2002, Mercedes-Benz officially launched the G-Class in the United States for the first time since its inception in 1979 with the G 500 and G 55 AMG.

2005 update
Mercedes-Benz announced the new G55 AMG Kompressor model with a more powerful, supercharged 5.4L V8 engine (code 113.993, or M113K), replacing the naturally aspirated 5.0L V8 engine (113.982, or M113). The G 500 was renamed as G 550 for certain markets (not USA until 2009).

2006 update
This minor update revised the engine range with a new 3.0-litre V6 diesel engine in the G 320 CDI, replacing both the G 270 CDI and G 400 CDI. The G 500 and G 55 AMG Kompressor continued unchanged. The G 320 with the petrol engine was dropped, marking the suspension of six-cylinder petrol engines until 2018. The G 55 AMG Kompressor remained as a five-door station wagon while the G 320 CDI and G 500 were offered in three body styles: two-door cabriolet and station wagons with three-door short and five-door long wheelbases.

2007 update
Mercedes-Benz showcased a heavily revised 2007 model at the Paris Motor Show in September 2006 with emphasis on an updated interior, engine range, and new safety equipment.

For 2007, the G-Class received its first high-intensity discharge headlamps, reversing camera, and tire pressure monitoring system (the latter two are federally mandated safety equipment for the United States). 2007 G500's in the USA start to phase out the 722.6 5spd transmission, and instead start coming with the new 722.9 7spd transmission. The G55(K)'s still have the 722.6 5spd transmission. The G 500 could be fitted with the sports side exhaust pipes from the G 55 AMG for extra cost.

The interior received a new instrument cluster with four chrome-trimmed round gauges from the C-Class and a new four-spoke multi-function steering wheel with options of full leather cover or combination of leather and wood. The centre console was updated with new control switches for the vehicle's functions and a new climate control panel along with new COMAND APS infotainment and navigation system. In conjunction with the reversing camera, COMAND APS displays the rear view and graph representation of distance and width, assisting the driver during reversing maneuvers. The new ARTICO upholstery colour, cognac, was added to black and grey interior colour options.

2008 update
The 2008 update included a new radiator grille with three thicker horizontal fins, replacing the previous seven, thinner fins. The COMAND APS infotainment and navigation system was revised with many new or extended functions such as the LINGUATRONIC voice control system, a 12-speaker Harman Kardon Logic 7 surround sound stereo system, TV tuner and a special off-road menu for the G 320 CDI and G 500 model. Heated and ventilated front seats were also offered.

Last year for the G500 in the USA.

2009 update
The 2009 G550 replaces the 2008 G500, and gets a new 5.5-litre V8 petrol engine with  [mated to the 722.9 7spd transmission], replacing the 5.0-litre  that was in the 2008 G500. The new engine will improve the acceleration for the new G550.

For the 30th anniversary of production, Mercedes-Benz offered two special anniversary editions. One was the G 500/G 550 with a more opulent interior and exclusive designo leather upholstery along with special decals. Another one was a new utility model, the G 280 CDI Edition 30 PUR, consisting of the W461 chassis with a 3.0-litre V6 turbodiesel engine (OM 642 DE LA red.) and the W463 four-wheel-drive system.

2011 update
Last year for the G55(K) [with 722.6 5spd transmission], in the USA.

2012 update

After its last major update in 2007, the interior received a completely redesigned instrument panel and centre console adapted from the ML-Class. The COMAND APS touchscreen and control panel were moved up toward the top of the dashboard for easier viewing and operation. The COMAND APS was updated with the MBrace2 telematics system. Additional safety features included DISTRONIC adaptive cruise control, blind-spot monitoring, revised PARKTRONIC reverse sensors and rear-view camera and revised ATS4 stability control for improved trailer stabilising functionality.

Externally, the G-Class received the same horizontal bars of LED daytime running lamps underneath the headlamps and the new external side rear-view mirrors as the GL-Class and ML-Class models. The AMG version received a new front bumper with three large air intakes.

The 5.4-litre supercharged V8 [with 722.6 5spd transmission] in the 2011 G55(K) will be replaced by a new 5.5-litre biturbo V8 [with 722.9 7spd transmission] for increased performance on the upcoming 2013 G63. Topping out the G-Class model range was a new G 65 AMG with a 6-litre biturbo V12 petrol engine. Two models were carried over unchanged: the G 350 CDI BlueTEC and G 500/G 550.

2016 update
For the 2016 model year, the outgoing M273 5.5-litre naturally aspirated V8 fitted to the G 500/G 550 was replaced by the new M176 4.0-litre biturbo V8 for increased horsepower and torque.

Technical data

Engine (1990–2018)
Notes: (m) and (a) denote "manual" and "automatic" transmissions where applicable. Fuel consumption marked with * denotes the older EEC regulation of "urban, 90 km/h, and 120 km/h" (U/90/120). Top speed with ** denotes the "electronically limited".

G-Class W463, second generation (2018–present)

The second generation G-Class (W463) was launched on 14 January 2018 at the North American International Auto Show in Detroit.

In contrast to its predecessor, the new G-Class has grown 121 millimeters in width and 53 millimeters in length. The ground clearance has increased by 6 millimeters. The increase in width is for more driving stability, sturdier side impact protection, and more seating comfort. The increased length, especially in the front end, is due to the new 2019 EU pedestrian impact safety regulations: the previous generation did not have enough open space between the car's front end and the rigid components beneath for the crumple zone as to mitigate the injury to a pedestrian's body.

A major change was with the steering system which was switched from a recirculating ball system to variable-ratio rack-and-pinion with adaptive electric power assistance. The new steering system allows safety and convenience equipment such as active lane-keeping assist, Pre-Safe collision avoidance systems and self-parking capability. The rack-and-pinion steering system does not work with solid front suspension so a change was made to use independent front suspension.

The extensive, ground-up redesign allowed engineers to incorporate more lightweight materials such as high-strength and ultra-high-strength steels and aluminums. In addition, the redesign led to an improved manufacturing process which increased structural rigidity. The gap between the doors and body shell is much narrower than the previous generation. Despite the increased dimensions, the weight has been reduced by about 170 kilograms.

The second generation W463 is similar visually to the first generation, and the chassis code, W463, is still retained rather than W464 as some media outlets erroneously reported. However, only three parts from the previous generation were carried over to the new generation: the headlamp washers, the push-button door handles and the spare wheel cover bolted to the rear tailgate.

The new G 500 (renamed to G 550 for 2020 onwards) is powered by the 4.0-liter M176 V8 twin-turbo engine, producing 416 hp and 450 lb⋅ft of torque. It is mated to a nine-speed automatic 9G-Tronic transmission with torque-converter.

For the new diesel variant, the G 350d was initially released for the 2019 model year, powered by the 2.9-liter OM656 inline-6 turbocharged diesel engine, producing 282 hp and 443 lb⋅ft of torque. The G 400d was later introduced for the 2020 model year onwards. The G 400d features the same OM656 engine as the G 350d, but output has been increased to 326 hp and 516 lb⋅ft of torque. Both models are still produced by Mercedes-Benz, however certain markets only sell one of the two.

The redesign also allowed newer safety and collision avoidance equipment from the W222 S-Class to be fitted to the G-Class for the first time. In addition, the updated interior has a new instrument cluster and infotainment system from other Mercedes-Benz models (A-Class (W177) and E-Class (W213)), air vents, steering column-mounted gear selector, multimedia system and control panel on the tunnel console, a higher level of luxury trimming and 64-color ambient lighting. A Burmester surround sound system and a larger dual 12-inch LCD display with smartphone integration (Apple CarPlay and Android Auto) were offered as optional equipment. One design element carried over to the new generation was the front passenger's grab bar on the dashboard.

The new G 550 and AMG G 63 have gone on sale in the United States with a starting price of $125,495 and $144,695 respectively. The 2019 G-Class for the US market has the widest range of exterior colors available, totaling 24, of any Mercedes-Benz passenger vehicle.

In September 2020, the G 350 was introduced for the Chinese market to circumvent the heavy taxation on larger engine displacement. It is powered by the 2.0-liter M264 turbocharged inline-4, producing 255 hp and 273 lb-ft of torque.The G 350 is the first G-Class with a four-cylinder inline engine since the previous model, the G 230, was dropped in 1995.

AMG models

AMG G 63 
Alongside the new G 550, Mercedes-AMG unveiled the new G 63 in March 2018 at the Geneva International Motor Show. The model is powered by the V8 twin-turbo M177 engine, producing 577 hp and 627 lb⋅ft of torque, an increase of 14 hp and 66 lb⋅ft over the previous generation G 63 AMG. Mercedes-AMG claims a 0-60 mph time of 4.4 seconds and a top speed of 149 mph with the optional Driver's Package. The G 63 now defaults to a rear-biased 40:60 torque split versus the 50:50 split of its predecessor.

In addition to the performance increases over the standard G 550 with the AMG model, the G 63 also features AMG-developed suspension, larger red brake calipers and perforated brake discs, AMG-specific transmission modes, radiator grille, flared wheel arches, striking side pipes on the exhaust system, and wider wheels up to 22-inches in diameter. The model features distinct front and rear fascias and body styling, as well as an AMG-specific interior with a standard AMG Performance steering wheel with flattened bottom.

AMG G 63 Edition 1 
To commemorate the launch of the second-generation G-63, Mercedes-AMG released the Edition 1 special edition at market launch. The special model features Designo Night Black Magno paint with contrasting matte Graphite Grey sports stripes along the vehicle sides, a decorative red stripe on the exterior mirrors, and Night Package featuring gloss black trim and accents. The Edition 1 also features matte black 22-inch forged wheels with red-painted rim flanges and a cross-spoke design, as well as red accents throughout the interior.

AMG G 63 Trail Package 
The optional AMG Trail Package can be specified for the G 63 model only, offering greater off-road capability and styling. The package adds softer settings for the adaptive dampers to enhance off-road driving and maneuverability. 20-inch wheels with five sets of twin spokes and all-terrain tires are part of the package. A black skid plate and mud flaps behind the rear wheels are fitted to the body.

AMG G 63 4x4² 
Following the previous generation's G 63 AMG 6x6 and G 500/G 550 4x4², Mercedes-Benz-AMG introduced the new G 63 4x4² for the second generation iteration in June 2022 via YouTube. The AMG G 63 4x4² features the same M177 V8 twin-turbo as the standard AMG G 63 but with output increased to 585 hp from 577 hp, and raised portal axles like the previous generation G 500/G 550 4x4², except now with independent front axles. The model went on sale Fall 2022 for the 2023 model year at a price of $350,050 USD.

Compared to the standard AMG G 63, the AMG G 63 4x4² features a raised height, larger carbon-fiber fenders, 22-inch wheels with 37-inch Pirelli 325/55R22 all-terrain tires, LED light bar, roof rack with carbon-fiber windscreen, carbon-fiber spare tire cover, and rugged styling. With this increase in height, the model offers a ground clearance 4.3 inches over stock at 13.8 inches, wading depth 8.2 inches over stock at 35.8 inches, and 41.3° approach and 36.8° departure angles.

Additionally, compared to the previous generation G 500/G 550 4x4², the wheelbase is increased by 0.9 inch to 113.1 inches, height is increased by 0.8 inch to 88.8 inches, width is increased by 5.4 inches to 82.5 inches, and length is increased by 3.9 inches to 181.1 inches, or 194.5 inches when accounting for the spare tire carrier. Weight is decreased by 379 lbs to 6,315 lbs. Mercedes-Benz claims an estimated 5.0 0-60 mph time.

Special models

G manufaktur (Individualisation Programme) 
Mercedes-Benz has introduced the bespoke/individualisation programme exclusive for the G-Class: G manufaktur. Similar to the Mercedes-Benz designo programme, buyers can specify different colour and material options. For the exterior, buyers can choose from 26 exclusive G manufaktur paint colours, and the Black Accents covers for the fender flares, roof, front and rear bumpers, external rear-view mirrors, rub stripes, spare wheel cover ring, wheels, side exhaust pipe tips, etc in gloss black paint. For the interior, 64 different seat colour combinations and three patterns can be specified. The dashboard and steering wheel cover can be ordered with a two-toned colour combination. On the passenger grab bar, the G manufaktur brand is etched on the stainless steel trim.

Stronger Than Time
To celebrate the 40th anniversary of the G-Class and the 20th anniversary of the G 55 AMG, Mercedes-Benz introduced the Stronger Than Time edition for the G 400 d, G 500, and Mercedes-AMG G 63. For the G 400 d and G 500, the edition is fitted with the AMG Line exterior package, black 20-inch AMG wheels, and stainless steel trim for the running boards, spare wheel cover, and door sills. The puddle lamps display the G-Class logo and Stronger Than Time on the ground. The driver's assistance package, LED headlamps, Burmester surround stereo system, and sunroof are added as standard equipment. The G 63 has a dark chrome grille and matte chrome covering the running boards, exhaust outlets, mirror caps, portions of the front and rear bumper, skid plate, and sections of the spare wheel cover. The 22-inch matte black AMG wheels are fitted to the G 63.

Three interior designs can be chosen: black Nappa leather with gold stitching and open-pore black ash wood trim; a mix of Macchiato Beige and Yacht Blue leather with light brown sen wood trim; and Macchiato Beige and Lounge Red with piano black lacquer. The Nappa leather trim covers the roof grab handles and the instrument cluster cover. The two-tone black and Titanium Grey Pearl Nappa leather with carbon fiber trim is exclusive to the G 63 model.

Professional Line 
With the success of Worker, Pur, and Professional variants in the previous W461 generation, Mercedes-Benz introduced the new Professional Line Exterior at the IAA Mobility 2021 in Munich. Professional Line Exterior is an exterior accessory options that the owners can customise their G-Class vehicles. The options include climbing ladder, roof rack, simpler spare wheel holder, black trims, headlamp protection grill shield, and like. Unlike the previous Worker, Pur, and Professional variants, Professional Line Exterior isn't a stripped-down utilitian version of G-Class and based on W461 chassis.

Concept cars

Concept EQG

On 5 September 2021, Mercedes-Benz previewed Concept EQG, the G-Class concept car with pure electric drive, at IAA Mobility 2021 in Munich. Externally, Concept EQG carries the styling of the second generation G-Class, with updated elements to distinguish the electric variant, such as a square tire cover, extensive additional LED lighting including a LED Black Panel grille, updated front and rear fascias, new 22-inch wheels, and special roof rack. While Mercedes-Benz has not revealed the technical data yet, Concept EQG has four electric motors that are placed closer to the wheels and that can operate independently; the battery packs are 108 kWH. Additionally, a two-speed gearbox allows the gear reductions for the off-road travel. The model names are EQG 560 4MATIC and EQG 580 4MATIC. The production version is confirmed for 2024.

Technical data

Engines (2018–present)

*With optional extra cost AMG Driver's Package

Transmission (2018–present)

Safety

Gallery

Military operators

 Since the 2010s, the Albanian Army has been using G-Class vehicles.

 Since the 2010s, the Algerian Army, Gendarmerie Nationale and the Algerian police have been using several models of G-Class vehicles 4x4 6x6 G 500. Most of those vehicles are manufactured in Bouchekif factory Tiaret, owned by the Algerian army. First G-Class wagons released in 2015.

 Since the 1980s, the Argentine Army has used the MB-230G (short and long chassis) for different purposes. 900 remain in service.

 In October 2007, Mercedes-Benz became the preferred tenderer for the Australian Defence Force to replace the fleet of Land Rover Perentie in Project Land 121 Overlander. Mercedes-Benz was the sole tenderer with neither Toyota for the Land Cruiser or Land Rover for the Defender submitting a proposal. In October 2008, an initial contract for 1200 vehicles was signed. 2,268 vehicles were purchased with ten variants including 6x6. Australia is the first military customer to receive 6×6 vehicles and these are the first six-wheel military vehicles built by Mercedes-Benz since 1941.

 The Austrian Army has been a long time user of various Puch G models.

 The Belgian Police or "Gendarmerie-Rijkswacht" has been a long time user of first G 500 models.

 The Bulgarian Army operates 600+ vehicles in various configurations, most of them armed.

 Royal Gendarmerie of Cambodia purchased 30 armored Mercedes-Benz G-Class from RMA Cambodia.

 60 "Wolf" in service with the Cameroon Armed Forces.

 A total of 1,159 vehicles have been ordered by the Canadian Army beginning in late 2003. Canada purchased three variants including: with Gun turret; non turreted; and military police. These vehicles are utilised by both Regular and Reserve units. An armoured kit can be fitted (or removed) in 8 hours by three soldiers. Their light armour has been criticised for leading to loss of life in Afghanistan, however it is considerably better than the Iltis predecessor. For the most exposed missions in Afghanistan 75 RG-31 Nyalas built by BAE Land Systems OMC, South Africa were used.: 

 Croatia bought 300 to 320 vehicles for needs of Croatian army and for operations in Afghanistan additional 30 RG-31 vehicles were delivered. Croatia uses mix of 4×4 vehicles in peacekeeping operations and the G-Class is a very popular choice within the Croatian Army. G-Class is supplemented by Land Rover Wolf and Iveco LMV.

 The Danish military bought the 240 GD (/24, /28 and /34 variants) to supersede the M151A1, the Volkswagen 181 ("Jagdwagen") and the Land Rover 88. First deliveries of the 240 GD were in 1985 and later the 290 GD (/24 and /28 variants) were also introduced. More than 1,300 have been put in service. A few 300 GE's have also been used — mainly by the Danish army EOD-services. Currently the Danes are taking delivery of over 2,000 270CDIs in several variants, starting in 2003.

 used by units of Army of the Timor Leste Defence Force.

 The Egyptian Army uses the G 320 (4 × 4) armoured personnel carrier has been designed as a private venture by the Kader Factory for Developed Industries and is based on the chassis of the commercial German Mercedes-Benz MB 320G (4 × 4) light vehicle. This vehicle is based on the long-wheelbase version of the German Mercedes-Benz G 320 4 × 4 with the chassis frame being modified by a heavy-duty suspension which has been designed to withstand the additional weight imposed by the armour package.

 The Estonian Defence Forces have a small number of various G-Class vehicles, which were purchased to replace the outdated UAZ and Volkswagen Iltis vehicles.

 The Finnish Army uses the Geländewagen mostly as armored vehicles and ambulances, but other versions are also in service.

 The French Army has the Peugeot P4 which is a derivative from the G-Class equipped with Peugeot engine and equipment.

 The German Armed Forces uses the G-Class under the name "Wolf". Over 12,000 vehicles have been delivered in over 50 versions, ranging from ambulance vehicles to armored vehicles used by the German special forces. In the 1970s the cheaper Volkswagen Iltis was preferred; now the Iltis is replaced by the "Wolf" and the armoured variant LAPV Enok.

 The Greek Army as well as Air Force, Navy and Police have several versions (462)  of the Geländewagen, manufactured by ELBO the Hellenic Vehicles Industry.

 The Hungarian Ground Forces have 233 of G-270 CDI BA 10, which is mounted with UMF light-machine gun platform, and 5 of G-280 CDI BA6 C+R SSA FB6. More will be purchased between 2010 and 2013.

 Paspampres (Indonesian Presidential Security forces) are using G 270 CDI for their fleet with SIRINA lights, Gunner Roof Mount, Bullbar, Black Grill, Roof and Rear View Mirror Handles. New model of G 300 CDI in 2010 acquired not less than 30 units for presidential and vice-presidential escort purposes. The Paspampres uses black G 300 CDI with the Military Police in white and ensigns with Indonesian MP insignia.

 The Kurdish Peshmerga has 60 "Wolf" including 20 lightly armored type to help fight off the ISIL forces.

 The Irish Army used a number of G-Wagens as ambulances.

 The KSF use more than 200.

 The Latvian Land Forces and Latvian National Guards use different modifications of Geländewagen, including armored.

 The Lebanese Army operates 20 G-wagon donated by Royal Dutch Army as ambulances

 The Lithuanian Armed Forces operates approximately 200 formerly Dutch GD vehicles since delivery in 2016. On December 17, 2021, the National Defence Volunteer Force will receive 125 ex-Dutch GDs for patrolling the land border with Belarus.

 The Military of Luxembourg uses the 300D variant of the Geländewagen.

 Locally built by DEFTECH since 2001, the G-Wagon is used along with Land Rover Defender as light transport of Malaysian Army. It uses the GD280 chassis.

 The Mexican naval defense secretary (SEMAR) announced in 2008, a contract to purchase large numbers of Mercedes-Benz military vehicles for the Mexican Marine corps. As of May 16, 2009 The SEMAR has received 20 of the 84 G-Class vehicles in order.

 The Ministry of Defense of Mongolia operates 10 G-class vehicles (Wolf) donated by the German Government in 2010.

 The Royal Netherlands Army uses various versions of the Mercedes-Benz G-Class, mostly 461 290GD manual gearbox, 290GD TD manual gearbox models and a 280cdi V6 model with automatic gearbox. The Dutch police and Koninklijke Marechaussee also use the G-Class. Most of the police versions are armored 463 models.

 The Korean People's Army appears to have acquired G-class vehicles, some of which were seen on the Workers' Party of Korea 65th anniversary military parade. At the funeral of Kim Jong-il his hearse was flanked by G-Class vehicles.

 The Norwegian Army bought 240 GD to replace Volvo and Land Rover 4×4 vehicles in the mid-1980s, and 300 GD to use as ambulances. The 300GD is also used to transport the launch control station and optical sensors for the NASAMS Air-defense system. During the 90's 290 GD's where bought, and in the first half of the 00's a small number of armoured 270 CDI's were put into service. Today the Defence Forces operates a total of 3000 vehicles. The escort company of the Norwegian Royal Guard employs a black G 500 AMG with police lights on the roof.

 96 GD 290 and 25 MB290GD WD in service with Wojska Lądowe. 13 GD 290 in service with the Żandarmeria Wojskowa.

 The Portuguese Marine Corps uses the G-class for light transport along with Toyota Landcruiser and Land Rover Defender 90.

 Police, state security units, military and governmental agencies are using the G-Class. Mostly civilian versions in black. Security escort vehicles for both the President and Prime Minister are black G 500 and G 55 AMG.

 The Serbian Military currently uses Puch 300GD model. They also uses the following models in 300GD33, 300GD6 and 300GD10 variants, for transport of VIP persons in 300GD3-LUX and 300GD6-LUX and Special Forces Brigade is use modified version designed for access to combat zone.

 The Singapore Army bought the 270 and 290 versions as secondary military transport. It is used in soft-top truck configuration and is known as a 1.5-tonner or simply "MB" to its users. And also some were used also for patrolling in a "jeep" form. The Army also deploys the extremely short-wheelbase, soft-top version for its Colonels, Battalion COs, Brigade and Division Commanders as personal field transports.

 The Military of Slovenia uses Mercedes-Benz G-Class vehicles mainly for transport.

 The Armed Forces of Slovak republic uses Mercedes-Benz G-280 CDI in 5th Special Forces Regiment.

 The Swedish Army uses MB 290/T (1994), MB 290GD (2000) and MB 270 CDI (2005). The GW is to be the main light terrain vehicle in the Swedish armed forces in the future. In 2011 a framework agreement was signed between FMV and Daimler AG. An initial contract for 105 300 CDI was signed.

 The Swiss Armed Forces uses the 230 with soft top as the primary general purpose carrier, and a hardtop version as mobile radio access point. It is in service since 1985 and gradually replaced Willys Jeeps, Steyr-Puch Haflinger light transports and Pinzgauer medium transports in the liaison and transport role. All versions in Swiss Army use are unarmed. From 2014, the Steyr Daimler Puch 230 GE is going to be gradually replaced by the Mercedes-Benz G 300 CDI 4x4 hardtop version, starting with a first series of 3,200 vehicles.

Royal Thai Army

 An Argentine Army G-Class captured by the British Army during the Falklands War was subsequently used by No. 18 Squadron RAF in West Germany for several years.  The British Commanders'-in-Chief Mission to the Soviet Forces in Germany (BRIXMIS) also used a number.

 Police, state security units, military and governmental agencies are using the G-Class. Mostly civilian versions in black. Security escort vehicles for both the President and Prime Minister are black G 500 and G 55 AMG.

 The USMC Interim Fast Attack Vehicle (IFAV) is a modified version of the Mercedes-Benz Geländewagen 290. It replaces the modified M-151A2 ton truck jeep used by the Marines as an FAV in the 1990s. The U.S. Marine Corps acquired 157 of the IFAVs distributed as follows:

 (I) Marine Expeditionary Force (MEF) Camp Pendleton, CA (33);
 (II) MEF Camp Lejeune, NC (25);
 (III) MEF on Okinawa, Japan (27);
 (IV) 17 Force Recon, Afghanistan (22);
 (V) 3 Force Recon Bn, Iraq (23);
 (VI) 1st Provisional DMZ Police Company, Korea (15); and
 (VII) various miscellaneous (12)

In the late 1990s the USMC acquired the G-Class model as the Interim Fast Attack Vehicle (IFAV), which was essentially a '97 to '01 DaimlerChrysler model 290 GDT, a diesel-power 2-door with a pick-up bed. This was compact and light enough to be transported inside a Sikorsky CH-53 Sea Stallion Helicopter.

Bodystyles 

US sales figures
2018: 3,970 
2017: 4,188 
2016: 3,950 
2015: 3,616 
2014: 3,090 
2013: 2,494 
2012: 1,330 
2011: 1,191 
2010: 919 
2009: 662 
2008: 931 
2007: 1,152 
2006: 587 
2005: 1,334 
2004: 1,491 
2003: 1,980 
2002: 3,114 
2001: 674

Motorsport
In 1983 a specially modified 280 GE won the Paris–Dakar Rally driven by Jacky Ickx and Claude Brasseur.

In popular culture 
A 1990 G-Class appears in the action film The Bourne Supremacy. It is involved in the film's last chase and is eventually destroyed in a crash with a concrete post.

See also 
 Force Trax - a very similar Indian SUV
 Force Gurkha - SUV based on G-Class chassis
 Beijing BJ80 - similar Chinese SUV
 Unimog

References

Notes

Bibliography

General

Workshop manuals

External links 

 
Press kit:
The new generation Mercedes-Benz G-Class: Forever young
Mercedes-Benz G 63 AMG 6x6: Taking the desert by storm

 
G-Class
Police vehicles
Luxury sport utility vehicles
Off-road vehicles
Mid-size sport utility vehicles
Dakar Rally winning cars
Retro-style automobiles
Military vehicles of Germany
All-wheel-drive vehicles
Convertibles
Military light utility vehicles
Euro NCAP large off-road
Cars of Austria
Cars introduced in 1979
1980s cars
1990s cars
2000s cars
2010s cars
2020s cars
Pickup trucks
Flagship vehicles
Military vehicles introduced in the 1980s
Cold War military vehicles of Germany